Rosa Duarte (full name: Rosa Protomártir Duarte y Díez) was born in Santo Domingo, Dominican Republic, on June 28, 1820, and she died in Caracas, Venezuela, on October 26, 1888.

Rosa was one of the sisters of Juan Pablo Duarte, an activist politician and one of the founding fathers of the Dominican Republic. Following her older brother's steps, Rosa strongly supported the Dominican independent cause by actively participating in secret societies such as La Trinitaria and La Filantrópica.

Biography 
Duarte was born in the city of Santo Domingo, more precisely, in a neighborhood called Santa Bárbara, on June 28, 1820. She was the daughter of Juan José Duarte y Rodríguez, a Spaniard from Vejer de la Frontera in Southern Spain, and Manuela Díez y Jiménez, a white Dominican or Criollo woman  from El Seibo. Her elder brother, Juan Pablo Duarte, is considered one of the fathers of the Dominican nation.

Influenced by her brother's ideals, Rosa devoted her life to his patriotic cause, becoming an active member of the political and military, independentist secret society called La Trinitaria. Her contributions towards the Dominican nation are considered by the historian Emilio Rodríguez Demorizi as the "New Testament" of the Dominican history.

Rosa and her group of friends participated in plays performed at a building that used to be an old jail --Cárcel Vieja--, located next to Borgellá Palace, in front of Parque Colon. From that strategic place, she and other activists would raise awareness about the independent cause. With these plays, this group of people would collect resources in order to buy ammunition and cover the expenses for the Dominican independent cause.

In 1845, Rosa was condemned to leave her homeland and was deported along with her mother and siblings, thus leaving behind her fiancée, Tomás de la Concha, who was executed in 1855 together with the soldier Antonio Duverge.

Death 
On October 26, 1888, Rosa died in Caracas, Venezuela, due to dysentery.

Her siblings died two years after she did.

Honors 
One of the main streets in Santo Domingo is called Rosa Duarte in her honor. The street goes from Bolívar Avenue until 27 de Febrero Avenue. There is also a metro station in Santo Domingo named after her.

References

Bibliography 
 Hoy digital: Rosa Duarte, una vida de entrega y sacrificios por la causa de la independencia
 El Municipio.com.do: Rosa Duarte, o la mujer relegada de la independencia

External links 
 Instituto Dominicano de Genealogía, Inc.: Rosa Duarte: su familia en sus apuntes

1820 births
1888 deaths
People from Santo Domingo
Deaths from dysentery
Dominican Republic activists
Dominican Republic women activists
Dominican Republic rebels
Dominican Republic people of Spanish descent
Dominican Republic emigrants to Venezuela
Dominican Republic independence activists
White Dominicans